Gervin is a surname.  People with this name include:

Derrick Gervin (born 1963), American professional basketball player, brother of George Gervin
Ernst Gervin (1908–1978), Norwegian magazine editor
George Gervin (born 1952), American professional basketball player, Naismith Hall of Famer, and brother of Derrick Gervin
Willy Gervin (1903–1951), Danish cyclist